The Dawson Film Find (DFF) was the accidental discovery in 1978 of 372 film titles preserved in 533 reels of silent-era nitrate films in the Klondike Gold Rush town of Dawson City, Yukon, Canada. The reels had been buried under an abandoned hockey rink in 1929 and included lost films of feature movies and newsreels. A construction excavation inadvertently uncovered the forgotten cache of discarded films, which were unintentionally preserved by the permafrost.

The 2016 documentary Dawson City: Frozen Time details the history and recovery of the films, and features footage restored from the reels. The DFF also features in the 2013 documentary short Lost Forever: The Art of Film Preservation.

Description

The 533 film reels date "between 1903 and 1929 and were uncovered in the rubble beneath [an] old hockey rink". Films starring Pearl White, Helen Holmes, Grace Cunard, Lois Weber, Fatty Arbuckle, Harold Lloyd, Douglas Fairbanks, and Lon Chaney, among others, were among the find. Along with the lost feature films, there was also rare footage of historic events, including the 1919 World Series.

History
Beginning in 1903, the Dawson Amateur Athletic Association (DAAA) began showing films in Dawson City, Yukon, Canada. The unreturned films were deposited in the local Canadian Bank of Commerce and later stored in the local Carnegie Library basement. The DAAA later converted a swimming pool to an ice rink, but because of improper conversion the ice rink suffered from uneven temperatures in the middle of the rink. In 1929, Clifford Thomson, then employed by the Canadian Bank of Commerce and also treasurer of the hockey association, solved the problem of the library's stock of film and the inadequate ice rink. Thomson took 500,000 feet of film and stacked the reels in the pool, covered the reels with boards and leveled the rink with a layer of earth.  The DAAA continued to receive new nitrate films which would later fuel the destruction of the entire complex in a fire in 1951. The films stored under the ice rink were preserved by permafrost and were later uncovered in 1978 when a new recreation center was being built.

The Dawson Film Find material was collected and preserved, with these prints becoming the last surviving records of some movie studios. Owing to its dangerous chemical volatility, the historical find was moved by military transport to Library and Archives Canada and the U.S. Library of Congress for both transfer to safety film and storage.

Films found
Not all films are complete, as some were too damaged to restore in their entirety.

The Office Boy's Birthday (1904)
A Trip through Palestine (1907)
Elephant Racing at Perak (1907)
Pasquali and Co (1909)
Professor Puddenhead's Patents: The Electric Enlager (1909)
The Girl of the Northern Woods (1910), Thanhouser
The Crippled Teddy Bear (1910), Independent Moving Pictures
Unexpected Help (1910)
Bluebird - The Boy Girl (1910)
The Rosary (1910)
His Sick Friend (1910)
Birth of Flowers (1911)
The Taming of the Shrew (1911)
Vindicated (1911)
Little Old New York (1911)
The New Woman and The Lion (1912)
Bobby's Dream (1912)
For the Papoose (1912)
Circumstantial Evidence (1912), William Selig, Selig Polyscope Company
A Christmas Accident (1912)
Out of the Deep End (1912)
The Martyrs (1912)
His Madonna (1912)
This Girls of Grassville (1912)
The Frog (1912)
A Windy Day (1912)
The Debt (1912)
Out of the Deep (1912)
The Heat Wave (1912)
The Golden Curl (1912)
For Professional Services (1912)
The Hand of Destiny (1912)
Giuseppe’s Good Fortune (1912)
Circumstantial Evidence (1912)
A Winter's visit to Central Park, New York City (1912)
The Butler and the Maid (1912), Thomas A. Edison, Inc.
The Mystery of the Glass Coffin (1912), Émile Chautard
Brutality (1912), D.W. Griffith, Biograph Company
Casey's Vendetta (1912), Edward Dillon, Komic Film Company
The $2,500 Bride (1912)
The Sphinx, or Mrs. Carter's Necklace (1912)
Pansy, the Story of a Bear (1912)
Bread Upon the Waters (1912)
The Lake Geneva Camp of the YMCA (1912)
The Angel of The Desert (1912), Rollin S. Sturgeon, Grace A. Pierce, Vitagraph Company Of America
Draga, the Gypsy (1913), Rex Motion Picture Company
Until We Three Meet Again (1913?), Lubin Film
What Is the Use of Repining (1913)
The Pit and The Pendulum (1913)
Balaoo (1913), Victorin-Hippolyte Jasset, Société Française des Films Éclair
Fatty's Day Off (1913)
Hello Central, Give Me Heaven (1913)
A Mix-Up In Pedigrees (1913)
The Rose of San Juan (1913)
The Pajama Parade (1913)
The Fifth String (1913)
The Guiding Light (1913)
The Wedding Gown (1913)
The Star (1913)
Leo the Indian (1913)
Up and Down the Ladder (1913)
Sketches from Life (1913)
Rastus and the Game-Cock (1913)
Pure Gold and Dross (1913), Keystone Film Company
Protecting San Francisco from Fire (1913)
Pathé's Weekly #17 (1914)
Daybreak (1914), Reliance Entertainment
White Dove's Sacrifice (1914)
Love Finds a Way (1914)
Frou-Frou (1914)
Slippery Slim, the Mortgage, and Sophie (1914)
The Master Hand (1914)
The Tie that Binds (1914)
The New Roads Mascot (1914)
Sweeney's Christmas Bird (1914)
Environment (1914)
The Boss of the 8th (1914)
The Housebreakers (1914)
You Can't Beat Them (1914)
His Responsibility (1914)
Mildred's Doll (1914)
The Servant Girl's Legacy (1914)
For Her Father's Sins (1914), John B. O'Brien, Anita Loos, Majestic Motion Picture Company
A Double Error (1914), Theodore Marston
The Demon of the Rails (1914), J. P. McGowan, Edward W Matlack, Kalem Company
Lucille Love, the Girl of Mystery (1914), Francis Ford, Grace Cunard, Otis Turner, Universal Film Manufacturing Studios, Gold Seal Films
The Fable of the Household Comedian (1914?), George Ade, Essanay Studios
The Fable of Why Essie's Friend Got the Fresh Air (1914?)
The Fable of the Prevailing Craze (1914?)
Wildfire (1915)
The Scandal Mongers (1915)
The Bludgeon (1915)
The Price (1915)
Her Shattered Idol (1915)
The Shulamite (1915), George Loane Tucker, Kenelm Foss, Jury's Imperial Pictures
The Heart of Jabez Flint (1915)
The Hazards of Helen: Escape of the Fast Freight (1915)
Tools of Providence (1915)
The Quest (1915)
No Soup (1915)
The Unpardonable Sin (1915), Shubert Film Corporation
The Patriot and the Spy (1915)
The Lure of a Woman (1915)
The Mysterious Lady Baffles and Detective Duck: Episode 1, The Great Egg Robbery (1915), Allen Curtis, Clarence Badger
Fun Amongst the Pharaohs, As Seen by Homer Croy (1915)
The Dancer's Ruse (1915), Biograph Company
Ambrose's Lofty Perch (1915), Mack Sennett
The Child Needs a Mother (1915), L-KO Kompany
The Salamander, Part Five (1915), B.S. Moss Motion Picture Corporation
The Burglar's Baby (1915), Domino Motion Picture Corporation
With the U.S. Army at San Francisco (1915?)
The Half-Breed (1916), Allan Dwan, Triangle
The End of the Rainbow (1916)
The Crimson Stain Mystery [Assorted Episodes] (1916)
The Rail Rider (1916)
The Mysterious Mrs. M (1916)
Love Aflame (1917)
The Madcap (1916)
Diplomacy (1916)
The Whirlpool of Destiny (1916)
Threads of Fate (1916)
The Place Beyond the Winds (1916)
Love and Brass Buttons (1916)
The Female of the Species (1916), Raymond B. West, Monte Katterjohn, New York Motion Picture Company
The Hidden Scar (1916)
Her Soul's Inspiration (1916), Maie B. Havey, Bluebird Photoplays
Gloriana [sic] (1916)
Temperance Town (1916)
The Purple Mask (1916)
The Seekers (1916)
The Unattainable (1916)
Pearl of the Army (1916)
If My Country Should Call (1916)
The Vicar of Wakefield (1916)
The Salamander (1916)
The Closer Road (1916)
The Iron Hand (1916)
Barriers of Society (1916)
The Social Buccaneer (1916), Jack Conway
The Strange Case of Mary Page (1916), J. Charles Haydon
The Girl and the Game (1916)
Rolling Stones (1916)
When Little Lindy Sang (1916)
Tropical Budget Animated News of the World (1916)
The Recoil (1917)
Bliss (1917)
Polly of the Circus (1917)
The Stolen Paradise (1917)
It Happened to Adele (1917)
The Little Orphan (1917)
A Soul for Sale (1917)
Princess Virtue (1917)
The Red Ace (1917)
A Girl's Folly (1917), Maurice Tourneur, Paragon Films
An Even Break (1917)
Chicken Casey (1917)
The Awakening (1917)
The Hunting of the Hawk (1917)
The Spotted Lily (1917)
Little Bo Peep (1917)
The Recoil (1917)
The Mystery of the Double Cross (1917)
The Great Stanley Secret (1917), Edward Sloman, American Film Manufacturing Company
The Neglected Wife (1917), Will M. Ritchey, Mabel Herbert Urner, Balboa Amusement Producing Company
The Seven Pearls (1917), Astra Film Corp
The Marriage Lie (1918)
Bread (1918)
Waifs (1918)
Stolen Hours (1918)
Avenged by the Sea (1918/1922)
The Sea Waif (1918)
British War Office (1918)
The Lightning Raider (1918)
Do Husbands Deceive? (1918), Rolin Film Company
British Canadian Pathé News 81A (1919)
British Canadian Pathé News 93A (1919)
International News, Vol. 1, Issue 52 (1919)
The Montreal Herald Screen Magazine (1919)
All Jazzed Up (1919)
A Sagebrush Hamlet (1919)
The Silver Girl (1919)
The Exquisite Thief (1919), Tod Browning, Universal Film Manufacturing Company, Inc.
The Nights of the Bathtub, Part Two (1919?)
British Canadian Pathé News 14A (1920)
British Canadian Pathé News 76 (1920)
British Canadian Pathé News 88 (1920)
Birth of Flowers (1920/1922)
The Little Clown (1920)
Unidentified Pathé Melodrama (1920/1922)
British Canadian Pathé News 63B (1921)
British Canadian Pathé News 2B (1921)
Boxing Match 
Frivolity
Screen Telegram
The Princess and the Fishbone
A Mix-Up at Court
A Set of Teeth
Through the Keyhole
The Lake of Dreams
The Marriage of Coca
The Red Feather
An Excursion to the Gorges du Loup
Dread of Doom, Itala Film 
The Plumber's Son, Part One, Universal Pictures

References

External links
 Library and Archives Canada catalog of Dawson holdings
 Library of Congress catalog of Dawson holdings
 Dawson City Collection summary statement

Film preservation
Silent film
1978 archaeological discoveries
1978 in Canada
Archaeology of Canada
Rediscovered films
Dawson City